USS Benicia may refer to one of two ships in the United States Navy named for Benicia, California:

 , a screw sloop launched in 1868 and decommissioned in 1875.
 , a gunboat used as a test bed for guided missiles; transferred to South Korea and then scrapped in 1998.

Sources

United States Navy ship names